Centertown, Center Town, Centretown, or Centre Town may refer to:

 Centertown, Tennessee, U.S.
 Centertown, Missouri, U.S.
 Centertown, Kentucky, U.S.
 Centretown, a downtown neighbourhood in Ottawa, Ontario, Canada
 Centretown West, a neighbourhood in Ottawa, Ontario, Canada

Other uses
 Centretown News, a newspaper published by Carleton University, Ottawa, Ontario, Canada

See also
 Centre Township  (disambiguation)
 Town Center (disambiguation)